= Open Cultural Center =

European non-governmental organisation

The Open Cultural Center (OCC) is a non-governmental organisation (NGO) that works towards the inclusion of refugees. The organisation is mostly run by volunteers and operates in Greece by organising cultural and educational projects. Their main office is based in Barcelona, Spain.

== History ==
OCC emerged by the cooperation of independent volunteers who met in refugee camps in Greece in 2016. These volunteers first established the Idomeni Cultural Center (ICC) in the Greek refugee camp of Idomeni. The volunteers now moved to the refugee camps in Sounio and Cherso to further develop their project. However, military security did not allow independent persons to enter the camps, so they constituted 'Cultural Centers' nearby the refugee camps where the focus was to offer education to children, and later also to offer language classes for adults. At was at this time that they established the main office in Barcelona, Spain, as the main founders were Catalan. When the Cherso camp closed down in the winter, and the refugees were temporarily relocated in houses, the organisation decided to open a Cultural Center near the camp of Polykastro, in the North of Greece. This center is still open.

== Activities ==
=== Greece ===
While at first the focus was mainly on offering education for children and language classes to adults in order to help with integration, the centers also started to organise recreational activities such as music, drawing and sports. The main goal of these activities was to offer stress-relief for the people staying in the refugee camps.

=== Spain ===
In Spain, OCC focuses on outreach work, awareness creation and cultural exchange projects in Spain. These projects are carried out from an artistic, educational and linguistic perspective.

== Projects ==
=== 'My friend' ===
One of the projects of OCC is 'My Friend', a book with drawings and testimonies of children in the refugee camps.

=== Refugee school ===
This project in Spain includes workshops that are adapted to different ages, and which explain the origin of the war in Syria.

=== Art exhibitions ===
OCC has organised several art exhibitions, such as an art exhibition made by refugee children, and a photographic exhibition showing the daily life in a refugee camp in Greece.
